Adairsville is a city in Bartow County, Georgia, United States. As of the 2020 census, the city had a population of 4,878. Adairsville is approximately halfway between Atlanta and Chattanooga on Interstate 75.

Geography
Adairsville is an exurban city at the northwest edge of metro Atlanta, at  (34.368925, −84.928212). U.S. Route 41 passes through the city, leading north to Calhoun and south to Cartersville. Interstate 75 runs through the eastern part of the city, with access from Exit 306 (State Route 140).

Climate 
Adairsville's climate is characterized by relatively high temperatures and evenly distributed precipitation throughout the year. According to the Köppen Climate Classification system, it has a humid subtropical climate, abbreviated "Cfa" on climate maps.

History 

Adairsville used to be a small Cherokee village named after Chief Walter (John) S. Adair, a Scottish settler who married a Cherokee Indian woman before the removal of the Cherokee in 1838. It was part of the Cherokee territory along with Calhoun and including New Echota.

After the removal of the Cherokees, the village became part of Georgia, and the residents kept the name Adairsville. One of the town's developers was William Watts, who had a railroad business interest in the town. He had brought the Western and Atlantic Railroad from Atlanta (still in use). He deeded land to the railroad and surveyed business lots including hotels, mills, and blacksmith shops around town. Watts's plan was successful and brought the town the nickname "Granary of the State"; it was incorporated in 1854. He lived in Adairsville in a home built on the foundation of an Indian cabin, on a hill overlooking the town.

During the Civil War, Adairsville was involved on the side of the Confederate States of America in 1861 against the Union. On April 12, 1862, the steam locomotive The General was pursued from Atlanta and passed through Adairsville as its people the Great Locomotive Chase. After that, Adairians set a three-day street festival in remembrance of the Chase. The Civil War came to the town in full force on May 17, 1864, when the Confederate army failed to defeat Sherman and his Union army during the Atlanta Campaign in the Battle of Adairsville. After the Civil War ended in 1865, Adairsville rebuilt and became a center of the carpet and textile industries, and of farm and transportation services, including its famous railroad. Historic buildings still intact in the town include the original train depot, which was involved in the Great Locomotive Chase.

Adairsville is well known for Barnsley Gardens. Now a golf resort, Barnsley Gardens is southwest of the city center. The home was built by Sir Godfrey Barnsley of Derbyshire, England, in the late 1840s for his wife, Julia. She died before the house could be completed, but it is said that her ghost appeared to Sir Godfrey, telling him to complete the work. It was brought about by the visions of Andrew Jackson Downing, the architect who designed the grounds of the U.S. Capitol and White House. The ruins of the great main house remain. Almost lost to time and the elements, the land, including all of the ruins, was bought in 1988 by Prince Hubertus Fugger, who restored the gardens and renovated the grounds into an upscale golf resort.

On January 30, 2013, at approximately 11:30 am, the city was struck by a violent high-end EF3 tornado, leaving one dead, dozens injured, and hundreds of businesses and residences destroyed.

Demographics

2020 census

As of the 2020 United States census, there were 4,878 people, 1,830 households, and 1,267 families residing in the city.

2000 census
As of the census of 2000, there were 2,542 people, 991 households, and 702 families residing in the city. The racial makeup of the city was 72.6% White, 22.5% African American, 0.3% Native American, 1.4% Asian, 1.5% from other races, and 1.7% from two or more races. Hispanic or Latino of any race were 2.0% of the population.

There were 1,568 households, out of which 35.2% had children under the age of 18 living with them, 78.3% were married couples living together, 19.0% had a female householder with no husband present, and 13.1% were non-families. 15.7% of all households were made up of individuals, and 5.7% had someone living alone who was 65 years of age or older.  The average household size was 2.57 and the average family size was 3.08.

In the city, the population was spread out, with 29.2% under the age of 18, 8.7% from 18 to 24, 29.7% from 25 to 44, 20.4% from 45 to 64, and 12.0% who were 65 years of age or older.  The median age was 33 years. For every 100 females, there were 85.1 males.  For every 100 females age 18 and over, there were 82.4 males.

The median income for a household in the city was $71,214, and the median income for a family was $74,828. Males had a median income of $31,123 versus $21,899 for females. The per capita income for the city was $14,828.  About 16.4% of families and 18.9% of the population were below the poverty line, including 24.4% of those under age 18 and 22.1% of those age 65 or over.

Notable people
 Godfrey Barnsley, 19th-century cotton magnate after whom Barnsley Gardens is named
 Jessica Barton, model and actress
 Vic Beasley, 1st Round Pick for the Atlanta Falcons
 Bobby Cox, Atlanta Braves manager
 Pretty Boy Floyd, a 1930s Midwestern outlaw, was born in Adairsville shortly before his family left Georgia for Oklahoma
 Wally Fowler, founder of the Oak Ridge Boys
 Bella Jarrett, actress and author

References

External links

 City of Adairsville official website
 Adairsville Depot at Railga.com
 Adairsville, Georgia, at Cartersville-Bartow County Convention and Visitors Bureau
 Adairsville Elementary
 Adairsville High School

Cities in Bartow County, Georgia
Cities in Georgia (U.S. state)